
This is a timeline of Scottish history, comprising important legal and territorial changes and political events in Scotland and its predecessor states.  See also Timeline of prehistoric Scotland.

To read about the background to many of these events, see History of Scotland. More information can also be found in the list of Scottish monarchs, list of British monarchs, list of First Ministers of Scotland, and list of years in Scotland.

 Centuries: 1st2nd3rd4th5th6th7th8th9th10th11th12th13th14th15th16th17th18th19th20th21st

1st century

2nd century

3rd century

4th century

5th century

6th century

7th century

8th century

9th century

10th century

11th century

12th century

13th century

14th century

15th century

16th century

17th century

18th century

19th century

20th century

21st century

See also 
Kings of Scotland family tree
 Timeline of British history
Timeline of prehistoric Scotland

Notes